Gynenomis is a genus of moths of the family Crambidae.

Species
Gynenomis mindanaoensis Munroe & Mutuura, 1968
Gynenomis sericealis (Wileman & South, 1917)

References

Pyraustinae
Crambidae genera
Taxa named by Eugene G. Munroe